The 1947 Buffalo Bills season was their second in the All-America Football Conference. The team improved on their previous output of 3-10-1, winning eight games. Despite the improvement, they failed to qualify for the playoffs for the second consecutive season.

The team's statistical leaders included George Ratterman with 1,840 passing yards, Chet Mutryn with 868 rushing yards and 73 points scored, and Al Baldwin with 468 receiving yards.

Season schedule

Division standings

References

Buffalo Bills (AAFC) seasons
Buffalo Bills
1947 in sports in New York (state)